The Diocese of Chersonesus (also called Diocese of Korsun) is a diocese of the Russian Orthodox Church which covers the territory of France, Switzerland, Liechtenstein and Monaco. This diocese is part of the Patriarchal Exarchate in Western Europe since 28 December 2018.

The current primate of the Diocese of Chersonesus is Metropolitan Anthony (Sevryuk) since 30 May 2019. The primate of the diocese of Chersonesus is also the primate of the PEWE.

History 

The diocese with its headquarter in Paris, France, was established on January 5, 1960 as part of the Exarchate of the Moscow Patriarchate in Western Europe, when Archbishop  of Clichy received the title of "Metropolitan of Chersonesus". The diocese was named after Chersonesus, called Korsun in Russian ( from Old East Slavic), an ancient city in Crimea, founded as a colony by the Greeks. According to a legend, it was there that Prince Vladimir of Kiev decided to become a Christian, opening a new page in the history of Russia.

From 1979 to 1990, the Diocese of Chersonesus did not have a ruling Bishop, because the clergy of the Moscow Patriarchate from the USSR were considered by the French authorities to be Soviet agents, and obtaining a visa for them was very difficult. In addition, the financial situation of the priests of the Exarchate of the Moscow Patriarchate was quite difficult.

By the decision of the Council of Bishops of the ROC on January 30–31, 1990, the Western European Exarchate was abolished, and its dioceses, including the Chersonesus one, were subordinated directly to the Holy Synod and the Patriarch of Moscow.

Only after the fall of the Iron Curtain did this situation change. New emigrants from the former USSR rushed to the countries under the jurisdiction of the Diocese, which made it possible to replenish the already existing parishes and create new ones. In addition, some parishes of the diocese were established in Spain and Portugal, where there were no parishes of the Moscow Patriarchate previously. On December 27, 2007, by the decision of the Holy Synod, the patriarcal parishes in Italy were separated from the diocese of Chersonesus and "subordinated to the canonical jurisdiction of the Bishop who bears the ".

On April 15, 2008, the Holy Synod of the Russian Orthodox Church ordered to open an Orthodox Seminary in France near Paris. Bishop  of Chersonesus was appointed Chancellor of the Seminary.

On December 25, 2013, after numerous approvals, a project was approved for the construction of an Orthodox Cathedral and a Russian spiritual and cultural center in Paris. The official opening of the spiritual and cultural center took place on October 19, 2016, and on December 4 of the same year Patriarch Kirill of Moscow and all Russia led the consecration of the Holy Trinity church in Paris.

On December 28, 2018, the Holy Synod of the Russian Orthodox Church formed the Spanish-Portuguese diocese which consists of Spain, Portugal and Andorra. At the same time, the diocese of Chersonesus and the newly created Spanish-Portuguese diocese became part of the newly established Patriarchal Exarchate in Western Europe (PEWE), and John (Roshchin) was appointed as primate of the PEWE and of the diocese of Chersonesus. Before that, the Diocese of Chersonesus took charge of the Orthodox communities of the Moscow Patriarchate in France, Switzerland, Portugal and Spain.

On 30 May 2019, the Holy Synod of the ROC decided to appoint archbishop Anthony (Sevryuk) of Vienna and Budapest as primate of the PEWE and of the diocese of Chersonesus. At the same time, John (Roshchin), who was until then the primate of the PEWE and of the diocese of Chersonesus, was appointed as primate of the ROC diocese of Vienna and Budapest to replace archbishop Anthony.

On 31 May 2019, archbishop Anthony was consecrated metropolitan because of his appointment as exarch of the PEWE.

Ruling bishops 
  (5 January 1960 - 14 January 1963)
 Anthony (Bloom) (14 January 1963 - 12 September 1968), administrator, Meropolitan of Sourozh
 Peter (L'Huillier) (12 September 1968 - 16 November 1979)
 Philaret (Vakhromeyev) (16 November 1979 - 28 March 1984), administrator, Metropolitan of Minsk
 Vladimir (Sabodan) (28 March 1984 - 20 February 1990), administrator, Metropolitan of Rostov
 Kirill (Gundyaev) (20 February - 27 October 1990), administrator, Archbishop of Smolensk
  (27 October 1990 - 18 February 1992)
  (14 January 1993 - 31 March 1999)
 Kirill (Gundyaev) (31 March - 6 October 1999), administrator Metropolitan of Smolensk
  (6 October 1999 - 24 December 2010)
Nestor (Sirotenko) (24 December 2010 - 28 December 2018)
John (Roshchin) (28 December 2018 - 30 May 2019)
Anthony (Sevryuk) (30 May 2019-)

References

External links 

 Information about the Diocese of Chersonesus on the official website of the ROC

1960 establishments in France
Eastern Orthodoxy in France
Eastern Orthodoxy in Switzerland
Eparchies of the Russian Orthodox Church
Christian organizations established in 1960